The R392 road is a regional road in Ireland linking Lanesborough, County Longford on the N63 to Mullingar, County Westmeath.

Its route takes it in an arch (NW to SE) roughly west of the Royal Canal, which it crosses three times. The main town en route is Ballymahon, where it crosses the N55 and the River Inny.

The R392 closely follows the route of a portion of an ancient ceremonial route known as the Slighe Assail, from Rathcroghan, in County Roscommon (the ancient capital of the kingdom of Connaught), to the Hill of Tara, in county Meath (the ancient capital or Ireland and residence of the High King of Ireland. As such it formed one of the legendary Five Roads of Tara. This largely accounts for the remarkable straightness of the R392 compared to other Regional roads in Ireland.
The route also closely passes the Hill of Uisneach, an even older royal and spiritual site than Tara located between the villages of Moyvore and Loughnavalley and place of origin of the festival of Bealtine.

West of Ballymahon, before crossing the River Shannon, the R392 runs adjacent and parallel to the Corlea Trackway, an ancient wooden trackway across a peat bog found by Bord na Mona workers in the 1980s and excavated fully in 1991. This link with the Corlea Trackway indicates the R392 route to be one of the oldest routes in Ireland, possibly even in Europe.

See also
Roads in Ireland
National primary road
National secondary road

References
Roads Act 1993 (Classification of Regional Roads) Order 2006 – Department of Transport

Regional roads in the Republic of Ireland
Roads in County Westmeath
Roads in County Longford